Saint Gertrude may refer to:

Gertrude of Nivelles (626–659), founded the Abbey of Nivelles located in present-day Belgium
Gertrude the Great (1256–1302), German Cistercian, mystic, and theologian
Geltrude Comensoli (1847–1903), Patron of Youth

See also 
Santa Gertrudis (disambiguation)
Gertrude of Hackeborn (1223–1292), abbess of the Benedictine convent of Helfta, near Eisleben in modern Germany; sometimes conflated with Gertrude the Great